Fizza Ali Meerza is a Pakistani film producer, and screenwriter best known for making films that tackle socio economic issues. She became known in Pakistani cinema with her debut film, Na Maloom Afraad (2014).

Career 
Ali Meerza started her career with Na Maloom Afraad which was a hit at the boxoffice. After that, she produced Actor in Law, Na Maloom Afraad 2, and Load Wedding.

Filmography

Films

Awards and nominations

References

External links 
 

Living people
Pakistani film producers
Pakistani screenwriters
Writers from Karachi
Year of birth missing (living people)